Brandon Rock (born July 8, 1972, in Chambersburg, Pennsylvania) is a former American middle-distance runner who specialized in the 800 meters.

He finished fifth at the 1995 World Championships in Athletics in Gothenburg and ran the 800 meters for the US at the 1996 Summer Olympics.

His personal best 800 m time was 1:44.64 minutes, achieved in June 1996 in Atlanta.

Rock ran collegiately for the University of Arkansas, the University of Nevada and Taft Junior College.  He won the 800 meter event at the 1995 NCAA Outdoor Championships and at the 1995 USATF Nationals as well.

Rankings

Rock was ranked among the best in the world and the US in his event from 1995 to 1997, according to Track and Field News.

References

External links

1972 births
Living people
American male middle-distance runners
Athletes (track and field) at the 1996 Summer Olympics
Olympic track and field athletes of the United States
People from the Las Vegas Valley
University of Arkansas alumni
Arkansas Razorbacks men's track and field athletes